Manjadikuru is a 2008 Malayalam film written and directed by Anjali Menon. A shorter video version of the film was premiered at the 2008 International Film Festival of Kerala, and won the FIPRESCI Award for best Malayalam film and Hassankutty award for Best Debutant Indian director.  In 2009, it received awards at the South Asian International Film Festival (SAIFF) at New York, winning five Grand Jury Awards - Best Film, Best Director, Best Screenplay, Best Cinematographer and Best Emerging Talent.

Plot
Manjadikuru is a story of homecoming from late 1980s, when 10-year-old Vicky arrives at his grandparents home in rural Kerala to attend his grandfather's funeral. The disjointed family gathers together for the sixteen-day-long funeral period. During this period, Vicky discovers more about himself, his family and culture than he had expected to. The journey is narrated through the memories of an adult Vicky who returns to the same house to recount the experience. After some years the boy returns as a young man, to visit old grounds, and finds the 'Lucky red seeds' scattered away.

Cast
 Sidharth as Vicky
 Vyjayanthi as Roja
 Rejosh as Kannan
 Arathi Sasikumar as Manikutty
 Thilakan as Appukuttan Nair (Vicky's grandfather)
 Kaviyoor Ponnamma as Devayani (Vicky's grandmother)
 Murali as Sanyasi Maaman / Murali
 Jagathi Sreekumar as Unni
 Bindu Panicker as Ammu
 Urvashi as Sujatha (Vicky's mother)
 Sagar Shiyaz as Hari (Vicky's father)
 Rahman as Raghu 
 Sharran Puthumana as Ravi
 Sridevika as Latha
 Praveena as Sheela
 Sindhu Menon as Sudhamani
 Thrissur Chandran as Vasudevan Nair
 Firosh Mohan as Balu
 Julia George as Sindhu
 Shrevya Kannan as Baby Seetha
 Poojappura Ravi as Lawyer
 Kannan Pattambi as Marimuthu
 Venu Machad as Vishnu/Shop owner
 Sreekumar as Police Inspector
 Prithviraj as elder Vicky
 Padmapriya as elder Roja

Release
The film released in theatres in May 2012, after winning awards in film festivals. For the commercial release, songs and additional scenes are added to the film to make it more appealing to people.

Soundtrack

Awards
Kerala State Film Awards 2012
 Best Screenplay - Anjali Menon
 Best Child Artist - Vyjayanthi
 Best Sound Editor - M. R. Rajakrishnan
13th International Film Festival of Kerala 2008
 Hassankutty Award for Best Debut Director - Anjali Menon
 FIPRESCI Prize for Best Malayalam Film in Malayalam Cinema Today section 
6th South Asian International Film Festival 2009
 Grand Jury award for Best Film
 Grand Jury award for Best Director - Anjali Menon.
 Grand Jury award for Best Screenplay - Anjali Menon.
 Grand Jury award for Best Cinematography - Pietro Zuercher.
 Grand Jury award for Best Emerging Talent - Vyjayanthi.
Other awards
 Best Debut Direction by a Woman at New Jersey ISACF, New York, US
 Certificate of Appreciation, SCHLINGEL International Film Festival, Germany
 Official selection to the 2010 La Rochelle International Film Festival, France.
 Official selection to Cinekid Festival, Amsterdam
 Official selection to Festival Internacional de Cine Para la Infancia Y La Juventud, Madrid, Spain
 Official selection to Indian Panorama, International Film Festival of India

Critical reception
Aswin J Kumar from The Times of India gave the movie 3.5 stars saying that "Manjadikkuru is a beautifully shot film that can be loved for its sheer earnestness and sense of belonging.". Chris Fujiwara from Federación Internacional de la Prensa Cinematográfica said that "It is a lesson in the ways of society but a metaphorical lesson for the audience, the kind of lesson that (as one imagines, or remembers, while watching Lucky Red Seeds) the cinema was invented to teach." Ben Umstead from Twitch Film said that "Manjadikuru is undoubtedly one of the most beautiful films about childhood I've seen. ".

Veeyen from Nowrunning gave the movie 3 stars saying that "Anjaly Menon's 'Manjadikkuru' is an ode to the inherent innocence that once existed in us. Appealing equally to viewers of all ages, the flight of fancy that she offers to this incredible world that once was, is certainly not to be missed! ".  Metromatinee said "The film has been kept simple, highlights relationships and family values, and has to be seen with the whole family. Verdict: Small But Beautiful & Nostalgic ...!" Parvathy Anoop from Deccan Herald stated that "Anjali Menon leaves no stone unturned as she explores elements of hypocrisy, love, sympathy and sorrow inside a large Nair family."

Paresh C Palicha from Rediff.com gave the verdict of 3 stars saying that "Manjadikuru is enchanting. In this film, Anjali Menon succeeds in giving us a charming view of the adult world seen through the eyes of a child." Sify gave the movie a verdict of Good stating that "Manjadikuru comes as a whiff of fresh air. Enjoy this fabulous debut of a new talent called Anjali Menon straightaway!". Indiaglitz gave the movie a rating of 6.5 in 10 stating that "'Manjadikkuru' is a right addition to the list of well made films that came out this year. Just have a go into this scent of fresh air."

Home media
The VCDs and DVDs were released by Satyam Audios on 17 June 2013.

References

External links
 

 മഞ്ചാടിക്കുരുവിനൊപ്പം ഇന്ദുലേഖ - an article on movieraaga.com by Tom Magatt 
Anjali Menon's Manjadikuru

2008 directorial debut films
2008 films
2000s Malayalam-language films
Indian children's films
Films directed by Anjali Menon